Mattia Cattaneo (born 25 October 1990) is an Italian professional road bicycle racer, who currently rides for UCI WorldTeam . As an amateur, Cattaneo won the Girobio in 2011 for the  team. He was named in the start list for the 2015 Vuelta a España.

Major results

2009
 1st GP di Poggiana
2010
 9th Coppa della Pace
2011
 1st  Overall Girobio
 1st Gran Premio Capodarco
 1st GP di Poggiana
 Giro Ciclistico Pesche Nettarine di Romagna
1st Prologue & Stage 3
 3rd Overall Tour de l'Avenir
 5th Overall Giro della Valle d'Aosta
2012
 1st Ruota d'Oro
 2nd Trofeo Franco Balestra
 3rd Overall Tour de l'Avenir
 10th Trofeo PIVA
2017
 2nd Overall Tour La Provence
1st Stage 3
 2nd Classic Sud-Ardèche
 4th Overall Tour de l'Ain
 5th Time trial, National Road Championships
 6th Giro dell'Appennino
 7th Overall Tour of Slovenia
 9th Trofeo Laigueglia
2018
 4th Milano–Torino
 5th Time trial, National Road Championships
 6th Giro della Toscana
2019
 1st Giro dell'Appennino
 2nd GP Industria & Artigianato di Larciano
 4th Overall Tour of the Alps
2021
 3rd Time trial, National Road Championships
 3rd Overall Tour de Luxembourg
1st Stage 4 (ITT)
 8th Overall UAE Tour
 9th Overall Tour de Suisse
2022
 2nd Time trial, National Road Championships
  Combativity award Stage 8 Tour de France

Grand Tour general classification results timeline

References

External links

Mattia Cattaneo's profile on Cycling Base

1990 births
Italian male cyclists
Living people
Cyclists from the Province of Bergamo
European Games competitors for Italy
Cyclists at the 2019 European Games
People from Alzano Lombardo